Reni is a town (tehsil and a block) in Alwar district of the Indian state of Rajasthan, situated 205 km from Delhi and 122 km from Jaipur. It is situated in between Bandkui and Rampura station.

Geography 
Reni city is surrounded by mountains so it is known as Neel Nagri.  There are many villages near Reni such as Cheemapura, Dera, Dagdaga, Tahtara, Parveni, Kharagpur, Nimbola etc. The town of Dausa is also not very far from Reni tehsil.

Education
Reni is listed in one of the "Educationally Backward RURAL Areas " of Rajasthan 's Alwar district.

While one part of distt. Medium",  having English textbooks but hindi medium teachers simultaneously(including govt. Institutions). 
 Swami vivekanand Government model school, Dera :-  { A 2013 initiative of Manmohan Singh's government to provide quality of education in educationally backward rural areas , co-affiliated with CBSE having 80% Central govt.'s budget share and remaining through state govt. was a milestone of educational reforms to render quality education like KVs , Sainik schools  but which emerged as major failure following  Excessive Staff shortage both teaching and non-teaching .
 }
Sant Siya Ram Public School
 Pratibha school, Reni
 Govt high school, Reni
 Adarsh govt girls sr. sec. school, Reni
 Vivekanand sr.sec. school, Reni
 Adarsh shiksha mandir, Reni
 Sant tersa sr. sec. school
 Vinayak children academy ( closed )
 Sunrise public school( closed )
 Glorious public school
 Baba ki Coaching, Reni

Colleges
 Govt. ITI college
 Gomti devi iti college
 Krishna arts girls college
 Sant bhagvati das college, Pinan
 shri sai ITI  College, Reni 
Saraswati ITI college, Reni
Saraswati  B.ed college, Reni
Saraswati Art's college, Reni
Govt Girl's college (since 2021 without infrastructure) currently working in 2 alloted rooms of govt. Sr. Sec. School, Reni

Banks
 Punjab National Bank
 State Bank of India (coming soon)
 Rajasthan Gramin bank
 Co-operative bank

Villages
Reni include multiple villages:
 Cheemapura (6 km)
 Dagdaga (9 km)
 Rampura (8 km)
 Bhuleri(7 km)
 Danpur(5 km)
 Dera(6 km)
 Hataoj(3 km)
 itoli (3 km)
 Perveni (3 km)
 Machari (11 km)
 Pinan (12 km)
 Ghari Sawai Ram (10 km)
 Jamdoli (10 km)
 Bhajera (5 km)
 Bahadurpur (6 km)
 Hirnoti (10 km)
 Rampura (8 km)
 Tehatada (4 km)
 Bajoli (3 km)
 Thumda (4.5 km)
 Mandawar (17 km)
 Rajgarh (16 km)
 Mundiya (3.5 km)
 Nangal (2 km)
 Alwar (52 km)

References

Cities and towns in Alwar district